Kepler-32c (alt. name KOI 952.02) is an extrasolar planet in orbit around its M-dwarf-type star in the Kepler-32 system, in the constellation of Cygnus. Discovered by planetary transit methods with the Kepler space telescope in January 2012, it presents a semi-major axis of 0.033 AU and temperature of 417.3 K. It has a radius of 2.2 Earth-radius and an orbital period of 8.7522 days.

See  also
List of planets discovered by the Kepler spacecraft

References

Exoplanets discovered in 2012
32c
Cygnus (constellation)
Transiting exoplanets